Transcription factor Sp2 is a protein that in humans is encoded by the SP2 gene.

Function 

This gene encodes a member of the Sp subfamily of Sp/XKLF transcription factors. Sp family proteins are sequence-specific DNA-binding proteins characterized by an amino-terminal trans-activation domain and three carboxy-terminal zinc finger motifs. This protein contains the least conserved DNA-binding domain within the Sp subfamily of proteins, and its DNA sequence specificity differs from the other Sp proteins. It localizes primarily within subnuclear foci associated with the nuclear matrix, and can activate or in some cases repress expression from different promoters.

Interactions 

Sp2 transcription factor has been shown to interact with E2F1.

References

Further reading

External links 
 
 

Transcription factors